is a Japanese novelist, essayist, and tarento represented by O.K. Production.

Filmography

TV and radio series

Former appearances

Films

Bibliography

References

External links
 
"Hōshanō Hakaritai" with Yuzuki Muroi 

Japanese novelists
Japanese essayists
Japanese entertainers
1970 births
Living people
People from Aomori Prefecture
Writers from Aomori Prefecture